Alan Gemmell OBE (born 6 April 1978) is the co-founder of FiveFilms4Freedom and former Director of the British Council in India. Gemmell was appointed as Chief Executive of the Commonwealth Enterprise and Investment Council in December 2018. Gemmell was appointed OBE in the 2016 New Year Honours List.  Gemmell was included in the 2017 Financial Times Top 20 Public Sector LGBT Executives and in GQ magazine's 2016 List of the 100 Most Connected Men in the UK.

Early life and career 
Gemmell attended Irvine Royal Academy and the Junior School of the Royal Scottish Academy of Music and Drama, where he studied piano and bass trombone and toured with the National Youth Orchestra of Scotland. He read law at Glasgow University.

Gemmell is the Director of the British Council in India and served as Director Israel from 2012 to 2016; Deputy Director Mexico (2011–2012); in São Paulo, Brazil (2011); and, as Director of External Relations, London (2008–2011).

Gemmell was included in the 2018 Financial Times list of Top 30 Public Sector LGBT Executives.

British Council

British Council India 

Gemmell is Director of the British Council Group in India, a 600-person operation. with a turnover over £40m. Gemmell supported the organisation's existing online and mobile offers to connect with India's millennial generation, and partner with the economic growth and knowledge ambitions of India's states.

British Council 70th anniversary in India

British Council 70th anniversary scholarships 

Gemmell secured Rs 18 crore (£1.75m) to create the British Council's first scholarship programme for women as part of the organisation's 70th anniversary in India in 2018. 100 Indian women were awarded funding to study a one-year master's degree in STEM at 44 British universities. The 70th anniversary scholarships launched a year-long Inspired by India campaign with a logo designed by Indo-British design house Studio Carrom based on the banyan tree mural of the late British artist Howard Hodgkin on the front of the British Council's Delhi HQ.

Gemmell announced a further £1 million for 70 British Council 70th anniversary scholarships during a visit by the 104 2018 scholars to meet British Prime Minister Theresa May at 10 Downing Street.

British Council India Garden at RHS Chelsea Flower Show 

Gemmell commissioned British Garden Designer Sarah Eberle to create the first British Council Garden at the 2018 RHS Chelsea Flower Show to mark the 70th anniversary year. The garden was funded by the Piramal Group,  Tata Consultancy Services (TCS), and the JSW Group

Changing Moves Changing Minds 

Gemmell announced a legacy project from the Chelsea Garden in partnership with the Royal Academy of Dance and the Marylebone Cricket Club. Changing Moves Changing Minds will use sport and dance to promote positive gender roles for 300,000 children and tackle sexism in schools.

Commonwealth Big Lunch 

Gemmell and Dr Achyuta Samanta, founder of the Kalinga Institute of Social Sciences (KISS), hosted lunch for 30,000 students and volunteers on 23 March 2018 at KISS to celebrate the Commonwealth and the 70th anniversary of the British Council in India. The British Council KISS Big Lunch was announced by British Prime Minister Theresa May in February 2018.

State engagement 

Gemmell focussed the British Council's work on States across India with a mission to partner their economic development and knowledge ambitions. He signed an agreement with Deputy Chief Minister Manish Sisodia and Macmillan Education to improve the English-Language skills of 12,000 young people in the state. Gemmell signed an agreement with the state of Maharashtra to train 30,000 teachers benefiting 1.5 million children across the state. Gemmell secure a partnership with the state of Andhra Pradesh and its Chief Minister Chandrababu Naidu, to train 100,000 college students. Gemmell signed an agreement witnessesd by Hon’ble Chief Minister Naveen Patnaik to support English teaching across the state and improve the skills of young people in Odisha.

Gemmell has led a focus on Northeast India signing an agreement with the North Eastern Council of the Ministry for Development of North Eastern Region of the Government of India.  The North Eastern Council partnership enabled the British Council to develop new partnership and education programmes across the North East.

Gemmell signed an agreement with the state of Arunachal Pradesh in the presence of Hon’ble Chief Minister Pema Khandu at the Tawang Festival in October 2018 to develop cultural and educational programmes. Gemmell signed an agreement with the Government of Sikkim to develop similar initiatives.

UK-India Year of Culture 

Gemmell was responsible for the 2017 UK-India Year of Culture, a year of cultural exchange announced by Prime Minister Narendra Modi on his November 2015 visit to the UK.  British Prime Minister Theresa May and Indian Prime Minister Modi referenced the Year of Culture and its unprecedented level of cultural exchange in the Joint Statement to mark the visit of PM Modi to London in April 2018.

Her Majesty The Queen hosted the official launch of the year on 27 February 2017 at Buckingham Palace with Indian Finance Minister Arun Jaitley representing Prime Minister Modi. Gemmell worked with the Palace, British Indian start-up Studio Carrom and 2017 Creative Director Ruth Ur to project a peacock, India's national bird, onto the facade of Buckingham Palace.

The programme for the year was announced by British Council Deputy Chair Rt Hon Baroness Prashar CBE PC, UK Minister of State for Digital and Culture Rt Hon Matt Hancock and Indian High Commissioner to the United Kingdom HE Mr Sinha at the British Film Institute on 28 February 2017. The programme includes an exhibition from the British Museum and The Chhatrapati Shivaji Maharaj Vastu Sangrahalaya in Mumbai, the first exhibition on Indian innovation at the UK's Science Museum, London, and the restoration of 1928 Indian movie, Shiraz, by the British Film Institute with a new score by British-Indian musician Anoushka Shankar.

Mix the City 

Gemmell inaugurated the Year of Culture in India on 6 April 2017 projecting elements of the Buckingham Palace Studio Carrom peacock onto the British Council's Delhi building and launching Mix the City Delhi. Gemmell commissioned Mix the City in 2015 working with UK tech start-ups Flying Object and Roll Studio, the BBC and the Arts Council of England. Mix the City is the British Council's first interactive art work. For the Year of Culture, Gemmell commissioned Mix the City in India's 4 main cities Chennai, Delhi, Kolkata and Mumbai. Gemmell launched Mix the City Mumbai in partnership with Rolling Stone India at a Music Expo hosted by the UK Government's Department of International Trade on 31 March 2017. He launched Mix the City Northeast in February 2018 at IIT Guwahati's student festival Alcheringa.

Mix the Play 
In November 2016 Gemmell launched  Mix the Play, an interactive digital theatre collaboration with Indian director Roysten Abel, during the visit of British Prime Minister Theresa May to India. Mix the Play allows users to direct Adil Hussain Kalki Koechlin, Kriti Pant and Tushar Pandey in the balcony scene of Shakespeare's Romeo and Juliet. Mix the Play was part of the U.K. Government's commemoration of the 400th anniversary of the death of Shakespeare. Mix the Play was again developed with Flying Object and Roll Studio.

Mix the Body 
In October 2017 Gemmell launched Mix the Body, an interactive dance platform with British choreographer Wayne McGregor.  Mix the Body lets users create a unique dance performance on their mobiles using dancers from McGregor's company Studio Wayne McGregor and Bangalore-based Attakkalri.  Users can set their dance to the music of British composers Max Richter and Jon Hopkins. Thus is the third interactive art work created with Flying Object and Roll Studio. The Mix series have been experienced by over 1.5 million people from 200 countries.

fiveFilms4freedom 

In 2015 Gemmell co-founded fiveFilms4freedom, an online, free, 10-day LGBT film festival promoting freedom, equality and LGBT rights, with the British Film Institute and the UN Free & Equal Campaign. The initiative was seen in 135 countries.

The second fiveFilms4freedom ran from 16 to 27 March 2016. The initiative was seen in 179 countries. In 2016 Gemmell also launched a Global List of people promoting LGBT rights.

For the fourth fiveFilms4freedom Gemmell developed a partnership with Indian mobile network operator Jio and selected the first Indian short film, Goddess, by director Karishma Dev Dube. 2.8 million people in India viewed the film on Jio's network.

Britain Israel Academic Exchange Partnership Regenerative Medicine Initiative (BIRAX RMI) 

Gemmell secured £7 million from British and international medical research foundations for the BIRAX RMI programme through partnerships with Parkinson's UK, JDRF, the MS Society and British Heart Foundation. BIRAX RMI has funded 15 research collaborations between scientists in Britain and Israel including a collaboration to develop a breath test for Parkinson's disease. The BIRAX programme has been supported by the Prime Ministers of Britain and Israel.

Middle East Water Research Programme 

Gemmell created the UK's first multi-lateral water research programme in the Middle East – a platform for scientists from across the region to work together with British scientists to tackle critical water issues. Five research projects were announced in April 2016 involving water researchers from Israel, the Occupied Palestinian Territories, Gaza, Morocco, Jordan and the UK. Gemmell also created a scholarship programme for water technology and health graduates of Palestinian universities to study full PhDs at Israeli universities.

Civil service 

Gemmell was a civil servant in the UK's Home Office and Cabinet Office (2002–2007). He was Private Secretary to Permanent Secretary Sir John Gieve (2003–2005), Assistant Director responsible for economic migration (2005–2006) and counter radicalisation advisor in the Cabinet Office Defence and Overseas Secretariat (2006–2007) headed by Sir Nigel Sheinwald.

Personal life 

Gemmell married Damien Lee Stirk, a ballet dancer and ballet teacher, on 18 July 2015. Their wedding was mentioned in the House of Commons of the UK Parliament by Conor McGinn MP. McGinn referenced Gemmell's wedding in the House of Commons on 28 March 2018 during a Ten-Minute Rule motion for leave to bring in the Marriage (Same Sex Couples) (Northern Ireland) Bill.  Stirk performed in Matthew Bourne's Swan Lake in the US, UK, Russia, Japan and in the film adaptation of Phantom of the Opera. He trained at the English National Ballet School, London (1996–1998) and the Royal Academy of Dance (2012) and has worked with the English National Ballet, the Israel Ballet and Ballet National de Marseille.

Honours and offices held 

Gemmell was appointed OBE in the 2016 New Year Honours List He is a Fellow of the Royal Society of Arts and a founding Leadership Fellow of St George's House, Windsor Castle. Gemmell was included on the 2017 Financial Times list of Top 20 Public Sector LGBT Executives. He is listed in GQ Magazine's 2016 Most Connected Men in the UK.

References

1978 births
Living people
Alumni of the University of Glasgow
People from Irvine, North Ayrshire
People educated at Irvine Royal Academy
Officers of the Order of the British Empire
British diplomats
LGBT diplomats
Scottish LGBT people
British LGBT civil servants
People of the British Council
21st-century LGBT people